Scott Frost (1952-1983) was a United States Harness Racing Hall of Fame Standardbred trotter trained and driven by future Hall of Fame inductee Joe O'Brien. His performances on the racetrack in 1954 saw him voted United States Two-Year-Old Trotter of the Year and in 1955 he became the first winner of the U.S. Trotting Triple Crown series and was voted U.S. Harness Horse of the Year. Racing at age four in 1956, Scott Frost became the first horse to twice win Harness Horse of the Year honors.

Breeding and sale
Scott Frost was bred by Tanglewood Farm in Clemmons, North Carolina owned by William N. Reynolds. On his death in 1951, the Executors of his estate sold the broodmare Nora in utero to Roy Amos, owner of Frost Hill Farm in Edinburgh, Indiana. Scott Frost was foaled and raised there until being sold at a 1953 Tattersalls Yearling Sale for $8,200 to Saull Camp, owner of S. A. Camp Farms, Inc. of Shafter, California.

External links
 YouTube video titled "1955 Hambletonian - Scott Frost & Joe O'Brien"

References

1952 racehorse births
1983 racehorse deaths
American Standardbred racehorses
Racehorses bred in Indiana
Racehorses trained in the United States
Triple Crown of Harness Racing winners
American Champion harness horses
United States Harness Racing Hall of Fame inductees